The 1st Armored Regiment is an armored regiment of the Italian Army based in Teulada in Sardinia. Originally the regiment, like all Italian tank units, was part of the infantry, but since 1 June 1999 it is part of the cavalry. The regiment is a training unit under the Army Military Command "Sardegna" and tasked to manage the Capo Teulada Training Range and provide the opposing force for visiting units.

History

Formation 
The regiment was formed on 15 September 1936 in Vercelli as 1st Tank Infantry Regiment with four battalions: I, II, and III assault tanks battalions and the IV Breach Tank Battalion. The assault tanks battalions fielded L3/35 tankettes, while the breach tanks battalion fielded Fiat 3000 light tanks. The regiment's initial structure was:

 1st Tank Infantry Regiment, in Vercelli
 I Assault Tanks Battalion "Ribet", in Turin (L3/35 tankettes)
 II Assault Tanks Battalion "Berardi", in Alessandria (L3/35 tankettes)
 III Assault Tanks Battalion "Paselli", in Monza (L3/35 tankettes)
 IV Breach Tanks Battalion, in Vercelli (Fiat 3000 light tanks)
 1st Tank Training Center, in Vercelli
 1st Tank Materiel Maintenance Workshop, in Vercelli

On 1 January 1938 the regiment received the XXIII Assault Tanks Battalion "Stennio", which had returned from Libya and on 30 November 1938 it ceded the IV Breach Tanks Battalion to the forming 32nd Tank Infantry Regiment, while receiving on the same date the IV Assault Tanks Battalion "Monti" from the 2nd Tank Infantry Regiment, the V Breach Tanks Battalion from the 4th Tank Infantry Regiment, and the XXII Assault Tanks Battalion "Coralli", which had returned from Libya. In 1939 the regiment ceded the III Assault Tanks Battalion "Paselli" to the 31st Tank Infantry Regiment, and the IV Assault Tanks Battalion "Monti" to the 32nd Tank Infantry Regiment. On 6 November 1939 the regiment ceded the XXII Assault Tanks Battalion "Coralli" and XXIII Assault Tanks Battalion "Stennio" to the forming 33rd Tank Infantry Regiment, and renamed the V Breach Tanks Battalion as CCCXXIII Breach Tanks Battalion, which soon after moved to Riva del Garda and was ceded to the 32nd Tank Infantry Regiment. In April 1940 tank battalions were renamed and the regiment entered World War II with the following structure:

 1st Tank Infantry Regiment, in Vercelli
 I Tank Battalion "L", in Turin (L3/35 tankettes, former I Assault Tanks Battalion "Ribet")
 1st Tank Training Center, in Vercelli
 1st Tank Materiel Maintenance Workshop, in Vercelli

World War II 
The regiment's baptism of fire came during the Italian invasion of France, when the regiment advanced with its battalion into Southern France. In early summer 1940 the regiment's I Tank Battalion "L" was sent to North Africa for the upcoming Italian invasion of Egypt, where it joined the X Army Corps. The regimental headquarters arrived in Libya in early July and on 20 July 1940 the 1st Armored Infantry Regiment's headquarter arrived in Mechili, where it remained and fulfilled administrative and logistic duties, while the regiment's commanding officer Colonel Pietro Aresca led the Babini Group's I Tankers Grouping (also known as "Aresca Group"). The regiment's headquarter remained in Mechili until 24 January 1941, when advancing British forces drove the Italians out of Mechili. As the regimental command had been destroyed during the British advance the regiment was declared disbanded on 8 February 1941.

The regiment was reformed on 15 March 1941 in Vercelli as training unit. For the remainder of the war the regiment trained replacement tank crews for the deployed units and occasionally also new battalions:

 I, II, IV, and X tank battalions "L" to replace units lost in the North African campaign
 X Tank Battalion "M14/41" with M14/41 tanks for the 133rd Tank Infantry Regiment (later transferred to the 132nd Tank Regiment)
 XV Tank Battalion "M14/41" with M14/41 tanks for the 31st Tank Infantry Regiment (half of the XV was raised by the 4th Tank Infantry Regiment)

On 1 August the regiment began with the formation of the I Tank Battalion "P" with new P 40 tanks, but after Italy changed sides with the Armistice of Cassibile on 8 September 1943 the 1st Tank Infantry Regiment was disbanded by the Germans and its materiel transferred to Wehrmacht units.

Cold War 
Immediately after ratification of the peace treaty between the allies and Italy on 15 September 1947 the Italians began to rebuild their army. A first tank battalion with M4 Sherman tanks was raised in spring 1948 in Rome, which moved in June to Casarsa della Delizia to make room for a second M4 Sherman tank battalion. On 10 July 1948 the two battalions were used to form the 1st Tankers Regiment in Rome, which joined the Armored Brigade "Ariete" on 7 September 1948. The brigade had been reformed earlier on 1 June 1948 without units. Regiment and brigade moved in fall 1948 to the Friuli Venezia Giulia region - the regiment to Casarsa della Delizia and the brigade headquarters to Pordenone. On 1 April 1949 the 1st Tankers Regiment was renamed 132nd Tankers Regiment "Ariete".

On 11 May 1959 the army activated the Armored Units Training Center in Teulada. On 1 May 1974 the center was renamed 1st Armored Infantry Regiment and received the flag and traditions of the 1st Tank Infantry Regiment. On 9 March 1993 the name was changed to 1st Armored Regiment.

Current structure 
As of 2022 the 1st Armored Regiment consists of:

  Regimental Command, in Teulada
 Command and Logistic Support Company
 1st Armored Battalion
 1st Tank Company "Falco" (Ariete main battle tanks)
 2nd Bersaglieri Company "Pantere" (Dardo infantry fighting vehicles)
 Support Weapons Company "Kobra"
 Self-propelled Artillery Battery (PzH 2000 self-propelled howitzers)
 Maintenance Company

External links
Italian Army Website: 1° Reggimento Corazzato

References

Tank Regiments of Italy